Tathagat Avatar Tulsi (born 9 September 1987) is an Indian physicist and a child prodigy. He completed high school at the age of 9 years, earned a BSc at the age of 11 years, and a MSc at the age of 12 years from Patna Science College (Patna University). In August 2009, he got his PhD from the Indian Institute of Science, Bangalore at the age of 21 years. In July 2010, he was offered a position as Assistant Professor on contract (a non-permanent teaching position for fresh PhD graduates) at IIT Mumbai.
His employment was terminated in 2019.

When he was admitted to a PhD program at the age of 17, the then dean of the physics department at the Indian Institute of Science, replying to a journalist's query, described him as a "good boy, very lovable and working to achieve his goals"; however, he declined to comment on the description of Tulsi as a prodigy.

Biography

He received wide public attention in 2001, when he was shortlisted by the Indian Government's Department of Science and Technology (DST) to participate in a Nobel laureates conference in Germany.

Tulsi was admitted by the Indian Institute of Science (IISc)., where his PhD thesis was on "Generalizations of the Quantum Search Algorithm". He co-authored an unpublished research manuscript ("A New Algorithm for Fixed-point Quantum Search") with Lov Grover, the inventor of a quantum search algorithm that goes by his name.

Tulsi was once cheered on as one of the most gifted Asian youngsters by TIME magazine, mentioned as "Superteen" by Science, "Physics Prodigy" by The TIMES, "Master Mind" by The WEEK and listed by Outlook as one of the smartest Indian youngsters. Tathagat Avatar Tulsi participated in the Stock Exchange of Visions project of Fabrica, Benetton's research centre in 2007.  He was invited by Luciano Benetton for a dinner in honor of Al Gore on 14 June 2007 in Milano, Italy. Tathagat's story was showcased by National Geographic Channel in the program My Brilliant Brain. The episode named "India's Geniuses" was aired on 13 December 2007 and was hosted by Bollywood actress Konkona Sen Sharma. He was interviewed by 14-year-old Trishit Banerjee for his magazine Young Chronicle.

See also
List of child prodigies

References

1987 births
Living people
21st-century Indian physicists
Mental calculators
Indian Institute of Science alumni
Scientists from Patna